This article describes all the 2009 seasons of Formula Renault series across the world.

Calendar
This table indicates the round number of each Formula Renault series according to weekend dates. The dark note indicates Winter Series dates.

Formula Renault 3.5L

Collective test for notable 2.0L drivers
Each year, Renault Sport Technologies invite the best Formula Renault 2.0L and some other drivers to test the Formula Renault 3.5L car. This season, the test occurred in October on the new Motorland Aragón track in Spain. The table present all invited drivers:

Formula Renault 2.0L

2009 Formula Renault 2.0 Eurocup season

2009 Formula Renault 2.0 West European Cup season
his is the second season of the WEC series. It include the French Formula Renault championship rewarding the best French driver (F) and reward also the Rookies driver (R).

 Point system : 15, 12, 10, 8, 6, 5, 4, 3, 2, 1 for 10th. In each race 1 point for Fastest lap and 1 for Pole position.
 Races : 2 race by rounds (first between 60 and 80 km, second between 20 and 30 minutes).

2009 Formula Renault 2.0 UK season

2009 Formula Renault 2.0 UK Winter Cup
The Formula Renault UK Winter Cup and Formula Renault BARC Winter Cup are held in same time, but with separated classification.
Point system : 32, 28, 25, 22, 20, 18, 16, 14, 12, 11, 10, 9, 8, 7, 6, 5, 4, 3, 2, 1.

2009 Formula Renault BARC season
The final standing was established with the best 10 results of the season. A Club Class (c) classification is also established for young drivers  they participe on the same race as the FR2000 series
Point system : 32, 28, 25, 22, 20, 18, 16, 14, 12, 11, 10, 9, 8, 7, 6, 5, 4, 3, 2, 1 for 20th. In each race 1 point for Fastest lap and 1 point for Pole position.

Results after round 11, standing after round 7:

(1) = Points include only the best 10 results
(c) = Club Class drivers

2009 Formula Renault BARC Winter Cup
See 2009 Formula Renault 2.0 UK Winter Cup.

2009 Formula Renault 2.0 Italia season
Point system : 32, 28, 24, 22, 20, 18, 16, 14, 12, 10, 8, 6, 4, 2, 1 for 15th. In each race 2 point for Fastest lap and 2 for Pole position.
Races : 2 race by rounds length of 30 minutes each.

2009 Formula Renault 2.0 Northern European Cup season

2009 LO Formule Renault 2.0 Suisse season
Point system : 25, 22, 20, 18, 16, 14, 12, 10, 8, 6, 5, 4, 3, 2, 1 for 15th. Extra 1 point for Fastest lap and 2 points for Pole position.
Races : 2 race by rounds.

2009 Formule Renault 2.0 Finland season
Point system : 30, 24, 20, 17, 16, 15, 14, 13, 12, 10, 9, 8, 7, 6, 5, 4, 3, 2, 1. No points for Fastest lap or Pole position.
Races : 2 or 3 races by rounds, about 20 minutes long each.

(1) = Races held at the same time than the 2009 Formule Renault 2.0 North European Zone season and count for both championship.
(2) = Races are held with Formula Renault 2.0 Sweden series.

2009 Formula Renault 2.0 Sweden season
This is the first season of the series.
Point system : 10, 8, 6, 5, 4, 3, 2, 1 for 10th. No points for Fastest lap or Pole position.

Note: This result table is still incomplete.

(1) = Races are held with Formule Renault 2.0 Finland series.
(2) = Races are held with Formule Renault NEZ series.

2009 Asian Formula Renault Challenge season
Point system : 30, 24, 20, 17, 15, 13, 11, 9, 7, 5, 4, 3, 2, 1 for 14th. No points for Fastest lap or Pole position. Drivers, that start their season at round 5 or later, don't receive any points for the final standing. The team point attribution is different from the driver point system : 10, 8, 6, 5, 4, 3, 2, 1.
Races : 2 races by rounds.

The Asian Challenge Category (A) reward the best Asian driver.

Rounds a and b indicate pre season races that didn't count toward championship standing.

2009 Formula Renault Elf 2.0 Argentina season
All cars use Tito 02 chassis.
 Point system : 20, 15, 12, 10, 8, 6, 4, 3, 2, 1 for 10th. 1 point for Pole position. 1 extra point in each race for participating driver.

Other Formulas powered by Renault championships
This section includes unofficial and/or Renault-engined formulae.

2009 GP2 Series seasons

The GP2 Series and GP2 Asia Series are powered by 4 litre Renault V8 engines and Bridgestone tyres with a Dallara chassis.

2009 Austria Formel Renault Cup season
The season is held on 12 rounds in 6 venues in Czech Republic, Germany and Austria. The races occur with other categories cars: Austrian Formula 3, Formelfrei and Formula 3,5L like (Renault 3,5L from Words Series, Lola Cosworth). This section present only the Austrian Formula Renault 2.0L classification.

Standing only after round 3/5:

2009 Formule Renault 2.0 North European Zone season
Point system : 25, 20, 16, 14, 12, 10, 8, 6, 4, 3, 2, 1 for 12th for rounds 1 to 4. 25, 20, 16, 14, 12, 10, 8, 6, 4 and 2 for 10th for rounds 5 and 6. 25, 20, 16, 13, 11, 9, 8, 7, 6, 5, 4, 3, 2, 1 for 15th for rounds 7 to 10. Also 1 point for Fastest lap and for Pole position.

(1) = Races are held at the same time than the 2009 Formula Renault 2.0 Finland season and count for both championship.
(2) = Races are held at the same time than the Formula Renault 2.0 Sweden season and count for both championship.
(3) = The final standing include only the best 9 results of the season.

2009 Formula 2000 Light season
This is the second season of the Formula 2000 Light held in Italy. The series use Tatuus Formula Renault or Dallara Formula 3 chassis with 2000 cc maximum engines and Michelin tyres.
Point system : 32, 28, 24, 22, 20, 18, 16, 14, 12, 10, 8, 6, 4, 2, 1 for 15th. In each race 2 point for Fastest lap and 3 for Pole position.
Races : 2 races by rounds.

The championship reward several sub categories : 
Over 35 : for drivers older than 35 years old (+).
Under 17 : for drivers younger than 17 years old (-).
Formula 3 : for drivers using Formula 3 chassis (F3).
Team : for racing team involved in all venues.

The rounds a and b held on Magione, March 7–8 are the opening venue doesn't reward points.

(-) = Indicate drivers younger than 17 years old.
(+) = Indicate drivers older than 35 years old.
(F3) = Indicate drivers using Dallara Formula 3 chassis with Opel or Fiat engine.
(FG)= Formula Gloria
(w) = indicate women drivers

2009 Formula 2000 Light Winter Trophy
Point system: 32, 28, 24, 22, 20, 18, 16, 14, 12, 10, 8, 6, 4, 2, 1 for 15th. Also 3 points for pole position and 2 for fasted lap.

† = Did not finish but classified for standing

2009 LATAM Challenge Series season
This is the second season of the Latin American (LATAM) Challenge Series held mainly Mexico. The series use Tatuus Formula Renault 2.0L F4RS engines and Kumho tyres.
Point system : 30, 24, 20, 16, 12, 10, 8, 6, 4, 2 for 10th. 2 Points for fastest lap and no points for pole position.

Freddy Zebede from the team Team Costa Rica/Uno Express Racing/PartyPokerRacing is crowned Rookie of the season.

2009 Super Fórmula 2.0 Brasil season
Point system : 30, 24, 20, 16, 12, 10, 8, 6, 4, 2 for 10th. Extra 1 point for Fastest lap and 1 point for Pole position.

The season include 10 races but the lack of participants force to cancel the series as it was the past year.

2009 Fórmula Renault Plus season
The series is held partially on the same rounds than its secondary series Fórmula Renault Interprovencial. It use Crespi chassis.
 Point system : 20, 15, 12, 10, 8, 6, 4, 3, 2, 1 for 10th. Extra 1 point for Pole position. All drivers receive 1 point for take part of the qualifying session.

The calendar include 10 rounds:
1. Autódromo Roberto Mouras (February 15)
2. Autódromo Ciudad De Río Cuarto (March 15)
3. Autódromo Termas de Río Hondo (March 29)
4. Las Paredes (May 26)
5. Autódromo Ciudad de Concordia (May 17)
6. Marcos Juárez Motor Club Circuit (June 7)
7. Autódromo Oscar Cabalén, Cordoba (July 12)
9.  Marcos Juárez Motor Club Circuit (September 13)
10. Autódromo San Jorge (October 18)
11. Autódromo Ciudad De Río Cuarto (November 8)

2009 Fórmula Renault Interprovencial season
The series is held in the same rounds than its main series Fórmula Renault Plus.
 Point system : 20, 15, 12, 10, 8, 6, 4, 3, 2, 1 for 10th. Extra 1 point for Pole position. All drivers receive 1 point for take part of the qualifying session.

1. Autódromo Ciudad De Río Cuarto (March 15)
2. Autódromo Oscar Cabalén (May 3)
3. Marcos Juárez Motor Club Circuit (June 7)
4–5. Autódromo Oscar Cabalén (July 11–12)
6. Autódromo Ciudad De Río Cuarto (August 23)
7. Autódromo Oscar Cabalén (September 13)
8. Autódromo Ciudad De Río Cuarto (October 11)
9. Autódromo Oscar Cabalén (November 15)

2009 Fórmula Metropolitana season
This is the second season of the Fórmula 4 Metropolitana series held on Argentina. Cars use Renault Clio K4M engine (1598cc) with low power than the former Fórmula 4 Nacional series held in 2007. Teams can choose chassis manufacturer (Crespi, Tulia, Tito...).

The calendar include 14 races in Argentina:
1. Autódromo Roberto Mouras (February 22), long track without chicanes
2. Autódromo Roberto Mouras (March 15), long track with chicanes
3. Autódromo Roberto Mouras (April 5), long track without chicanes
4. Autódromo Sudamericano de Olavarría (May 10)
5. Autódromo Roberto Mouras (May 31)
6. Autódromo 9 de Julio I (June 14)
7. Autódromo Roberto Mouras (July 5)
8. Autódromo Roberto Mouras (August 16)
9. Autódromo Sudamericano de Olavarría (July 26)
10. Autódromo 9 de Julio II (September 6)
11. Autódromo Roberto Mouras (September 27)
12. Autódromo Roberto Mouras (October 25)
13. Autódromo Roberto Mouras (November 15)
14. Autódromo Oscar Alfredo Gálvez (December 6)

References

External links
2009 standings at formularenault-2008.gpworld-online.com

Renault
Formula Renault seasons